David Beaty (26 October 1811 – 3 October 1889) discovered oil at his home in Warren, Pennsylvania in 1875. He was reportedly searching for a deposit of natural gas that he could use to heat his home. After this discovery, Warren's economy became almost completely geared toward the production of oil, and later to the refining of oil.

Legacy

Warren still is home to Beaty Middle School, which operates partially on funds still available from David Beaty's estate.

References

1811 births
1889 deaths
People from Warren County, Pennsylvania
People from Beaver County, Pennsylvania
19th-century American businesspeople